Kilmarnock and Loudoun was a constituency of the Scottish Parliament (Holyrood). It elected one Member of the Scottish Parliament (MSP) by the plurality (first past the post) method of election.

From the 2011 Scottish Parliament election, Kilmarnock and Loudoun was redrawn and renamed Kilmarnock and Irvine Valley.

Electoral region 

The region covered all of the Falkirk council area, all of the North Lanarkshire council area, part of the South Lanarkshire council area, part of the East Ayrshire council area and a small part of the East Dumbartonshire council area.

Constituency boundaries and council area 

The  constituency was created at the same time as the Scottish Parliament, in 1999, with the name and boundaries of an  existing Westminster (House of Commons) constituency. The Westminster constituency was created during the period of local government regions and districts, 1975 to 1996, when there was a Kilmarnock and Loudoun district of the Strathclyde region. In 1996 regions and districts were replaced with unitary council areas. Scottish Westminster constituencies were mostly replaced with new constituencies in 2005.

The Holyrood constituency covers a northern portion of the East Ayrshire council area. The rest of the East Ayrshire area is covered by Carrick, Cumnock and Doon Valley, which also covers a southern portion of the South Ayrshire council area. Carrick, Cumnock and Doon Valley is within the South of Scotland electoral region.

Boundary review 

 See  Scottish Parliament constituencies and regions from 2011 

Following their First Periodic review into constituencies to the Scottish Parliament in time for the 2011 elections, the Boundary Commission for Scotland recommended the creating of a new seat to be known as Kilmarnock and Irvine Valley

This new creation is formed by the Kilmarnock, Annick, and Irvine Valley electoral areas of East Ayrshire.

Member of the Scottish Parliament

Election results

2007 Parliamentary election

2003 Parliamentary election

1999 Parliamentary election

Footnotes

External links
Constituency website

Politics of Kilmarnock
1999 establishments in Scotland
Constituencies established in 1999
2011 disestablishments in Scotland
Constituencies disestablished in 2011
Scottish Parliament constituencies and regions 1999–2011
Galston, East Ayrshire
Politics of East Ayrshire
Darvel
Stewarton